Gráinne Maguire is an Irish stand-up comedian, writer and podcaster.

Early career
Maguire was a finalist in the 2007 Laughing Horse new act competition and a finalist in the 2008 Funny Women competition.

Career
At the Edinburgh Fringe Festival in 2016 Maguire had a show entitled Great people making great choices.
At the 2017 Edinburgh Festival Maguire had her one woman show Gráinne with a Fada. as well as a panel show on at the Cabaret Voltaire entitled What Has The News Ever Done For Me? Maguire returned to the Edinburgh Festival in 2018 performing at the Gilded Balloon with her show I forgive you, please like me.

Gráinne Maguire has appeared on BBC Radio 4 satirical comedy The Now Show, More Money Than Sense and Breaking The News as well as Stewart Lee’s The Alternative Comedy Experience.

Maguire has been a writer for comedy shows The News Quiz, Newsjack and Dead Ringers on BBC Radio 4 as well as television shows  The Last Leg and 8 out of 10 Cats for Channel 4. Maguire has also written columns for The Guardian.

Maguire has been a panellist on the BBC 1 flagship debate show Question Time. Maguire has been a guest on BBC 2 programme Daily Politics, and BBC current affairs investigative programme Panorama. Maguire produces a podcast with Marie Le Conte called Changing Politics.

Personal life
Maguire was born in Ireland but now lives in London. A Labour supporter, she opened at the Labour Party Conference for then leader Ed Miliband. In 2016 Maguire used Twitter to live-tweet her menstrual cycle to Taoiseach Enda Kenny in protest at Ireland’s abortion laws, the coverage of which appeared major international newspapers, and Maguire was interviewed on BBC Worldwide, and BBC World Service. Maguire has spoken of her respect for Michelle Obama.

References

Living people
Year of birth missing (living people)
Irish women comedians
21st-century Irish women writers
Women television writers
Irish stand-up comedians
Irish comedy writers
Irish humorists
Irish satirists
Irish television writers